Dusit is a tambon (subdistrict) of Tham Phannara District, in Nakhon Si Thammarat Province, Thailand. In 2017 it had a population of 7,051 people.

History
The subdistrict was created on 1 July 1990 by splitting off five administrative villages from Tham Phannara.

Administration

Central administration
The tambon is divided into 11 administrative villages (mubans).

Local administration
The whole area of the subdistrict is covered by the subdistrict administrative organization (SAO) Dusit (องค์การบริหารส่วนตำบลดุสิต).

References

External links
Thaitambon.com on Dusit

Tambon of Nakhon Si Thammarat Province